Marco Booij (born 10 April 1973) is a Dutch water polo player. He competed in the men's tournament at the 2000 Summer Olympics.

References

External links
 

1973 births
Living people
Dutch male water polo players
Olympic water polo players of the Netherlands
Water polo players at the 2000 Summer Olympics
Sportspeople from Barendrecht